Sunshine Canada is a Canadian short film television series which aired on CBC Television in 1967.

Premise
This series of National Film Board of Canada films was presented for children in association with the Canadian Centennial. Topics included Banting and Best's discovery of insulin, the establishment of Montreal, the RCMP Musical Ride and the Saint Lawrence Seaway.

Scheduling
This half-hour series was broadcast on Tuesdays and Thursdays at 5:00 p.m. (Eastern time) from 4 July to 5 September 1967.

References

External links
 

CBC Television original programming
1967 Canadian television series debuts
1967 Canadian television series endings
National Film Board of Canada series
1960s Canadian children's television series
Canadian Centennial